The Spada Codatronca (sometimes called the SVS Codatronca) is an Italian-built supercar introduced by Spada Vetture Sport in 2008. A convertible version, the Spada Codatronca Monza, was introduced in 2012. Both cars used a modified chassis and engine from the Chevrolet Corvette C6, but featured all-new bodywork.

Codatronca TS
Released in 2008, the Codatronca TS was the first car in the Spada Codatronca line, and featured styling based on that of the Alfa Romeo TZ. The chassis was derived from that used by the Chevrolet Corvette C6, but featured all-new bodywork. The bodywork is made from carbon-fibre, whilst the aluminium chassis features a roll cage. It uses Brembo disc brakes all around;  discs with eight-piston aluminium calipers at the front, and  discs with four-piston aluminium calipers at the rear. 19" OZ alloy wheels are fitted, and shod with Pirelli P-Zero Corsa tyres; 285/35 R19 at the front, and 345/35 R19 at the rear. A more powerful TSS version was planned, but never produced.

Codatronca Monza
In 2011, Spada Vetture Sport announced that they would be building a convertible version of the Codatronca TS, named the Codatronca Monza. The Codatronca Monza also featured the Italian Air Force roundel on the sides of the vehicle. The Codatronca Monza appeared at the 2012 Geneva Auto Show, where a competition version was also announced.

References

Cars of Italy
Cars introduced in 2008
Chevrolet Corvette
2010s cars
Sports cars